Coenodomus cornucalis is a species of snout moth in the genus Coenodomus. It is known from Papua New Guinea.

It has a wingspan of 22mm.

References

Moths described in 1907
Epipaschiinae